Is That So? is an album by pianist John Hicks's Trio recorded in Holland in 1990 and released on the Dutch Timeless label.

Reception
The Allmusic review stated "Is That So? (which Hicks produced himself) may not be the most challenging or chance-taking album of the improviser's career, but his lyrical, melodic pianism is still attractive. And his accompaniment isn't anything to complain about... Is That So? falls short of essential, but all things considered, it is an album that Hicks' hardcore fans will find to be pleasing and solid".

Track listing
All compositions by John Hicks except as indicated
 "Is That So?" (Duke Pearson) - 7:30
 "Autumn Leaves" (Joseph Kosma, Jacques Prévert, Johnny Mercer) - 6:22
 "How Insensitive" (Antônio Carlos Jobim, Vinícius de Moraes) - 8:52
 "April Eyes" - 5:10
 "Yesterdays" (Jerome Kern, Otto Harbach) - 4:50
 "Emily" (Johnny Mandel, Johnny Mercer) - 7:48
 "I'll Remember April" (Gene de Paul, Patricia Johnston, Don Raye) - 9:09
 "Never Let Me Go" (Jay Livingston, Ray Evans) - 8:11
 "Softly, as in a Morning Sunrise" (Sigmund Romberg, Oscar Hammerstein II) - 5:21
 "Sonnymoon for Two" (Sonny Rollins) - 6:14

Personnel
John Hicks - piano
Ray Drummond - bass
Idris Muhammad  - drums

References

John Hicks (jazz pianist) albums
1991 albums
Timeless Records albums